Bolo Pasha, originally named Paul Bolo, (24 September 1867, Marseilles – 17 April 1918, Vincennes) was a Frenchman who was a Levantine financier, traitor, and a German agent. The New York Times wrote that he "circumnavigated the globe, engaged in various curious occupations, participated in many shady schemes." The French secret police and Scotland Yard failed to collect enough evidence to convict him of treason, but he was eventually convicted with the help of evidence collected by the New York Attorney General. He was executed by firing squad on April 17, 1918.

Early life
Paul Bolo was born in Marseille, the younger brother of "an eloquent French prelate". He changed occupations frequently. His first place of employment was a barber's shop where he worked as an assistant. After a few months, he became the owner of a small soap shop. His soap business eventually failed and so he decided to sell lobsters. The lobster sales were large, but expenses were greater than the income and the venture failed. He then left Marseille and became involved with a silk manufacturing company in Lyon. He later managed a photographic shop, but this business also was short-lived.

Bolo's next sojourn was in Paris where he quickly became "a man about town". He was easy-going and intelligent and became a frequent guest in the "convivial circles" of Paris. He married a woman who was older and much richer than he was; she died and left her fortune to him, and he went to Egypt.

Travel to Egypt and beyond
Bolo was an adventurer, and Egypt was considered to be "the Mecca of adventurers" at that time. A multicultural country appealed to this inquisitive Frenchman.

Almost as soon as Bolo arrived in Egypt he sought a meeting with the ruler,  Abbas Hilmi, the last Khedive of Egypt and Sudan. Hilmi, who spoke fluent French, was as eager to meet with Europeans visiting Cairo as they were eager to meet with him. Bolo and Hilmi liked each other from the first meeting. They met frequently, and at one of those meetings, Bolo was presented with the title of Pasha. Paul Bolo thus became Bolo Pasha.

Bolo accompanied Hilmi on various outings: to a petrified forest and on boat trips along the Nile, with richly decorated boats. Bolo and Hilmi were seen together, visiting the statue of the Sphinx, the pyramids and the Mosque of Muhammad Ali, which is situated in the Citadel of Cairo. Gradually Bolo became an intimate friend of Hilmi, and as such he was present at some unusual court ceremonies, some of which he planned himself. One was a reception for a Consul-General from one of the European countries.

This was a carefree time in Bolo's life, but Hilmi had foreseen trouble. Hilmi thought he was about to be deposed, and he knew his country's history: a deposed Khedive would not be admired. Hilmi decided to use his friend Bolo to help him save as much as possible of his fortune. Newspaper articles of the time preserve this history:

Bolo found himself suspected because of his frequent trips between Paris and Geneva. During March 1915, Bolo met with Hilmi in Switzerland. Apparently Bolo was given $2,500,000 to be used to pay the French media in order to influence the public to accept peace with Germany.

Travel to United States
On February 22, 1916, Bolo arrived in New York City. He spent almost a month there, leaving on March 17, 1916. During the time he spent in New York, Bolo tried to avoid being seen in the company of German agents, but he traveled to Washington, DC, for a secret meeting with Count Johann Heinrich von Bernstorff, the German ambassador in Washington to the United States.

Von Bernstorff masterminded an operation to organize German sabotage in the U.S. He was assisted by the Military Attaché Captain Franz von Papen, who purchased an established New York import/export firm, G. Amsinck & Co., to act as an intermediary for the financing of German espionage and sabotage in the US and launder the financial transactions.   
In 1915 von Bernstorff and Bolo had devised a scheme to destabilise the French war effort by corrupting the French press in order to force an early armistice with Germany. The Paris newspaper Le Journal, owned by Senator Charles Humbert, was to be one of the papers to carry misleading 'fake news'. 

The banking firm Muller, Schall and Company acted for the pair and used G. Amsinck & Co. as a front to facilitate the transfer of $1,700,000 to fund the subterfuge. Amsinck and Co. had also arranged payments to the men who attempted to sabotage the Welland Canal in 1916. Von Papen was expelled from the US in December 1915 after various unexplained sabotage incidents and explosions. G. Amsinck & Co.'s involvement was finally exposed when the US declared war on Germany on 6 April 1917 and the US severed diplomatic relations. This led to raids by the FBI on various business premises including Deutsche Bank, and the Bolo connection was discovered. Amsinck was mostly purged of its German connections and staff, and re-organised as G. Amsinck & Co., Inc.

When the French government appealed to the governor of New York asking for help in collecting evidence against Bolo, Merton E. Lewis, the Attorney General of New York State, was assigned to the case. He collected some "sensational" evidence:

One of the most important pieces of evidence was the letter Bolo wrote to the New York City branch of the Royal Bank of Canada on March 14, 1916:

Arrest and trial
 
Bolo was arrested in Paris on September 29, 1917 and held in Fresnes Prison. He was tried at court-martial (France was under a military government during the war) and was charged with treason. Bolo exclaimed:
When asked why he never kept records of his money transfers, Bolo responded: "I am the master of money, not its slave!"

Abbas Hilmi was summoned as a witness, but he failed to arrive in Paris. However, Bolo's second wife was a strong witness on his behalf, as was his brother. Senator Charles Humbert, whom Bolo had mentioned in his letter to the Royal Bank of Canada on March 14, 1916, was summoned as a witness. The senator testified that "he never suspected for a moment that there was any hidden motive in the deal for the bonds of the newspaper."

In his last appeal to the court, Albert Salles, Bolo's attorney, said: Salles' speech was to no avail. The court convicted Bolo and sentenced him to death. The conviction was based on circumstantial evidence, and the decision was made after only 15 minutes of deliberation.

Bolo Pasha was executed by firing squad at the Fort Neuf de Vincennes on the morning of April 17, 1918.

After the execution, Georges Clemenceau, the Prime Minister of France, addressed the American people:

See also
 Hotel Cecil, London, nicknamed "House of Bolo"

References

External links
 

World War I spies for Germany
1918 deaths
Criminals from Marseille
Year of birth missing
People executed by France by firing squad
Executed people from Provence-Alpes-Côte d'Azur